David Britton (born August 26, 1958) is an American former basketball player. He played college basketball for Texas A&M University where he was named MVP of the 1980 Southwest Conference men's basketball tournament.

Early years
David Britton was born in Harlem, New York at St Luke Hospital to Theodore and Verdelle Britton on August 29, 1958.  He attended John F. Kennedy High School in The Bronx.

Texas A&M University
At Texas A&M, Britton was a first-team all Southwest Conference player in his senior season in 1979–1980. Playing alongside "The Wall" of centers Rudy Woods and Claude Riley, and forwards Vernon Smith (basketball) and Rynn Wright, as well as point guard Dave Goff, Britton's senior team set the school record of 26 victories.  They earned a place in the 1980 NCAA Tournament, beating Bradley and eking out a double-overtime victory against North Carolina before losing in overtime to eventual national champion Louisville. Britton was named to the All-Midwest Regional Team for his performance in the tournament.

Professional career
The Dallas Mavericks chose Britton as the 11th pick in the third round of the 1980 NBA draft, but he did not play with the team, joining the Washington Bullets instead. He appeared in two games for the Bullets before he was waived in end of December.

References

External links
NBA statistics at Basketball Reference
Statistics at Statscrew.com

1958 births
Living people
American men's basketball players
Dallas Mavericks draft picks
Junior college men's basketball players in the United States
Maine Lumberjacks players
Point guards
Potomac State Catamounts basketball players
Sportspeople from the Bronx
Basketball players from New York City
Texas A&M Aggies men's basketball players
Washington Bullets players